Bojanowo may refer to the following places:
Bojanowo in Greater Poland Voivodeship (west-central Poland)
Bojanowo, Masovian Voivodeship (east-central Poland)
Bojanowo, Pomeranian Voivodeship (north Poland)